Fred Rust was a member of the Wisconsin State Assembly.

Biography
Rust was born on December 10, 1908 in Taylor County, Wisconsin. He graduated from high school in Medford, Wisconsin. He died on May 26, 2003.

Career
Rust was elected to the Assembly in 1952. Additionally, he was Chairman of Deer Creek, Taylor County, Wisconsin, Treasurer of Taylor County and a member of the Taylor County Board. He was a Republican.

References

People from Taylor County, Wisconsin
Mayors of places in Wisconsin
County supervisors in Wisconsin
Republican Party members of the Wisconsin State Assembly
1908 births
2003 deaths
20th-century American politicians